Ciarán Brian Chambers (born 4 February 1994) is an Irish badminton player from Belfast, Northern Ireland. He competed for Northern Ireland at the 2014 and 2018 Commonwealth Games.

Chambers educated sport and exercise science at Ulster University. His sister Sinead Chambers also a professional badminton player.

Achievements

BWF International Challenge/Series
Mixed doubles

 BWF International Challenge tournament
 BWF International Series tournament
 BWF Future Series tournament

References

External links 

1994 births
Living people
Sportspeople from Belfast
Irish male badminton players
Badminton players at the 2018 Commonwealth Games
Badminton players at the 2014 Commonwealth Games
Commonwealth Games competitors for Northern Ireland